Jesús Gónzález Macías (born 27 May 1972) is a Mexican politician from the Ecologist Green Party of Mexico. From 2007 to 2009 he served as Deputy of the LX Legislature of the Mexican Congress representing Nuevo León.

References

1972 births
Living people
People from Tampico, Tamaulipas
Ecologist Green Party of Mexico politicians
21st-century Mexican politicians
Deputies of the LX Legislature of Mexico
Members of the Chamber of Deputies (Mexico) for Nuevo León